Moushumi Chatterjee (born  Indira Chattopadhyay) is an Indian actress who is recognised for her work in Hindi as well as Bengali cinema. She was one of the highest paid actresses in Hindi films during the 1970s. She joined the Bharatiya Janata Party in 2019.

Early and personal life
Chatterjee was born in Calcutta into a Bengali Brahmin family which hailed from Bikrampur in undivided Bengal. Her father, Prantosh Chattopadhyaya, was in the Indian Army and her grandfather was a judge. Her real name is Indira and Moushami is her screen-name.

At a young age, Indira Chattopadhyaya (her real name) was married to Jayanta Mukherjee, a gentleman of her own community and similar family background, in a match arranged by their families in the usual Indian Bengali way. The couple have been blessed with two daughters. The marriage has proved entirely harmonious and happy. Her husband, Jayanta Mukherjee, is the son of music composer and singer Hemant Kumar. Jayanta is also an exponent of Rabindra Sangeet. With the support and encouragement of her husband and father-in-law, Indira accepted the offer of acting in a film and took Moushami as her screen name. Thus, her film career began only after her wedding. She has always prioritised her family above everything else.

Career

1967–1984: Debut and breakthrough
Chatterjee made her film debut in the Bengali hit Balika Badhu (1967), directed by Tarun Majumdar. In an interview, Moushumi Chatterjee quoted: "After Balika Badhu, I was flooded with Bengali movies but I wished to complete my studies. However, movies were in my fate hence when I was studying in class X, a close aunt of mine was on her death-bed and her last wish was to see me married. Hence, to satisfy her wish I got married." She was called as Indira at home. She got engaged to guardian and neighbour Hemant Kumar's son, Jayant Mukherjee (Babu). "I fell in love with Babu. He was the first man I came in touch with outside my family." She was then seen in Bengali films like Parineeta, Anindita.

Her debut as heroine in the Hindi film Anuraag in 1972 was directed by Shakti Samanta. The film became a major success. She played a blind girl who falls in love, and her performance earned her a Filmfare nomination as Best Actress. Anuraag won the Filmfare Award as Best Film. About her Hindi film debut, she said in an interview: "As my father-in-law was a renowned film celebrity, many film personalities used to throng our house. One among them was filmmaker Shakti Samanta, who insisted upon me to act in movies. I declined, but both my father-in-law and my husband encouraged me, thus I got Anuraag." When asked about her first role in Hindi films she said that "[w]hen Shaktida told me that I have to play a blind lady I was taken aback. I honestly told Shaktida that I may not do justice to the role as I have never studied a blind person, but Shaktida assured me that he will take me to a blind school and train me ... he insisted to do a small Mahurat shot before. [...] When I reached the studio I was excited to see Bollywood luminaries like Nutanji, Dadamoni (Ashok Kumar fondly called), Rajesh Khanna, S. D. Burman and others. The moment Shaktida called action I did my Mahurat shot confidently and was applauded. After the shot, Shaktida told me that I had given the shot so skillfully that there was no need to visit a blind school!"

In 1973, she acted in Naina opposite Shashi Kapoor, Kuchhe Dhaage with Vinod Khanna and Us Paar with Vinod Mehra. In 1974, she acted with the then-struggling Amitabh Bachchan in the thriller Benaam and opposite Rajesh Khanna in the suspense drama Humshakal. Her most successful film came at the end of 1974, where she played a rape survivor in Manoj Kumar's Roti Kapada Aur Makaan. Her performance earned her a Filmfare Nomination as Best Supporting Actress. She went on to become a part of several successful films like Swarg Narak, Maang Bharo Sajna, Pyaasa Sawan, Jyoti Bane Jwala with Jeetendra, Swayamvar with Shashi Kapoor and Anand Ashram with Rakesh Roshan. She acted with Rishi Kapoor in four films none of which were successful.

She was paired with Vinod Mehra in 10 films, including Anuraag, Us-Paar, Raftaar, Umar Qaid, Mazaaq, Zindagi and Do Jhoot. She only acted in 2 films with Amitabh Bachchan, Benaam and Basu Chatterjee's Manzil (1979). Her Bengali film with Uttam Kumar, Ogu Bodhu Sundari, released in 1981 and became successful. In 1982, she did the Marathi film (cameo role for song "Tumhi Adkitta Mi Ho Supari") Bhannat Bhanu. Her successful films with Rajesh Khanna included Bhola Bhala, Prem Bandhan and Ghar Parivar. She worked with Sanjeev Kumar in Angoor, Daasi and Itni Si Baat. In 1985, she acted in the Bengali film Pratigna.

After 1985, she graduated to supporting roles in several movies like Watan Ke Rakhwale, Aag Hi Aag and Ghayal.

1985–present: Transition period
From 1985 to 1991, Chatterjee got more offers as a character actress and she made the transition to roles of mother and bhabhi (sister-in-law), often pairing with Dharmendra or Sunil Dutt. She played Sunny Deol's sister-in-law in Ghayal. Occasionally, she got lead roles in films in the 1990s such as Ghar Parivaar and Aa Ab Laut Chalen, both opposite Rajesh Khanna, then Santaan, Prateeksha (1993) and Udhaar Ki Zindagi with Jeetendra. Some of her films as supporting actress since 1995 include Keemat: They Are Back (1998), Aa Ab Laut Chalen (1999) and Na Tum Jaano Na Hum, Hum Kaun Hai? (2004).

In 2006, Moushumi Chatterjee made a comeback to cinema, with Tanuja Chandra's Zindaggi Rocks. She did the Indo-Canadian production Bollywood/Hollywood in 2003.

Her Bengali films as the lead heroine include Balika Badhu (1967), Parineeta (1969), Anindita (1972), Anand Ashram (1977), Ogu Bodhu Sundari (1981), Prarthana (1984), Shatarupa (1989), Kari Diye Kinlam (1989), Bidhilipi (1991) and later as supporting actress; Nater Guru (2003), Bhalobasar Anek Naam (2005), The Japanese Wife (2010) and Goynar Baksho (2013). She sang a song titled "Tomar Duare" in the film Mallick Bari (2009). In 2014, she won the Filmfare Award for Best Supporting Actress for the Bengali film Goynar Baksho and received the Filmfare Lifetime Achievement Award in 2015.

Political foray
Chatterjee contested in 2004 Lok Sabha election as a candidate for Indian National Congress, but lost. In 2019, she joined Bharatiya Janata Party. Her daughter Payal died on 13 December 2019.

Awards

Filmography

Prarthana
Kari Diye Kinlam
Hatyara as Gauri Vijay Singh (1977)
Be-Rahem
Sesh Sangbad (2016)
Raksha as Asha (1982)
Ghar Ki Laaj (1979)
Bhalobasar Onek Naam as Bini (2006)
Shatarupa 
Bidhilipi
Bouthan
Nater Guru as Manisha's Mother (2003)
Kartavya (1995)
Muqaddar (1996)
Rusvai
Badla aur balidaan
Dekha pyar tumhara
Love in Canada (1979)
Kahani ek chor ki
Aan aur shaan
Ek baap chhe bete
The Cheat
Balika Badhu (1967)
Parineeta (1969) as Lalita
Anuraag (1972) as Shivani
Anindita (1972)
Naina (1973)
Kuchhe Dhaage (1973) as Sona
Ghulam Begam Badshah (1973)
Zehreela Insaan (1974)
Us-Paar (1974) as Kamla (Kamli)
Roti Kapada Aur Makaan (1974) as Tulsi
Humshakal (1974) as Radha/Sita
Badla (1974) as Kalpana
Benaam (1974) as Sheela Srivastav
Umar Qaid (1975)
Raftaar (1975) as Rani/Rita
Natak (1975)
Mazaaq (1975) as Moushumi
Do Jhoot (1975)
Anari (1975)
Sabse Bada Rupaiya (1976) as Sunita
Jai Bajrang Bali (1976) -- Devi Maa Sita
Zindagi (1976) as Seema (as Moushumi)
Anand Ashram (1977/I) as Kiran
Ab Kya Hoga (1977) as Lady who asked for a cup of Tea
Tumhari Kasam (1978) as Vidya
Swarg Narak (1978) as Shobha Mohan Kapoor
Phool Khile Hain Gulshan Gulshan (1978) as Shanti
Phandebaaz (1978)
Dil Aur Deewar (1978) as Saroj
Bhola Bhala (1978) as Renu
Do Ladke Dono Kadke (1979) as Rani
Prem Bandhan (1979) - Meena Mehra
Gautam Govinda (1979) as Sandhya
Manzil (1979) as Aruna Khosla 
Swayamvar (1980) as Roopa Bhargav
Maang Bharo Sajana (1980) as Sita Ram Kumar
Jyoti Bane Jwala (1980) as Anu
Chambal Ki Kasam (1980)
Do Premee (1980) as Payal/Parvati Singh Dogra
Pyaasa Sawan (1981) as Shanti
Ogu Bodhu Sundari (1981)
Krodhi (1981) as Aarti
Itni Si Baat (1981) as Asha
Daasi (1981)
Bhannat Bhanu (Marathi film, cameo role for song "Tumhi Adkitta Mi Ho Supari") (1982)
Angoor (1982) as Sudha A. Tilak
Justice Chaudhury (1983) as Janki Chaudhary
Pet Pyaar Aur Paap (1984)
Jawaani (1984) as Prema Mohan
Ghar Ek Mandir (1984)
Urbashi (1986)
 Mahananda (1987) as Ms. Mahananda
Sindoor (1987) as Sunita Kapoor
Aag Hi Aag (1987) as Mrs. Ganga Singh
Mera Karam Mera Dharam (1987) as Mala
Watan Ke Rakhwale as Laxmi Suraj Prakash (1987)
Param Dharam (1987) as Savitri
Taqdeer Ka Tamasha as Geeta (1988)
Waqt Ki Awaz (1988) 
Vijay (1988) as Rita
Agnee (1988) as Shobha
 Aakhri Gulam (1989)
Aakhri Baazi (1989) as Parvati P. Kumar
Jung Baaz (1989) as Mrs. Krishna Prasad Saxena
Sikka (1989) as Laxmi
Shehzaade (1989) as Padmini Singh
Taqdeer Ka Tamasha as Geeta (1990)
Ghayal (1990) as Indu Mehra
Ghar Parivaar as Parvati (1991)
Pyar Ka Devta as Chief Justice Saraswati Manohar Rai (1991)
Zulm Ki Hukumat (1992) as Pitamber's wife
Khule-Aam (1992) (as Moushmi Chatterjee) as Roopa
Nishchaiy (1992) as Renuka Singh
Prateeksha (1993) as Laxmi
Santaan (1993) as Laxmi
Udhaar Ki Zindagi (1994) as Janki
Ikke Pe Ikka (1994) as Kaushalya Devi
Kartavya (1995) as Sharda Varma
Jallaad (1995)
Kareeb (1998) as Neha's Mother
Doli Saja Ke Rakhna (1998) as Mrs. Chandrika Bansal
Keemat – They Are Back (1998) as Sulakshana Tripathi
Aa Ab Laut Chalen (1999) as Rohan's Mother
Na Tum Jaano Na Hum (2002) as Mrs. Malhotra
Bollywood/Hollywood (2002) as Mrs. Seth
Hum Kaun Hai? (2004) as Mrs. Martha Pinto
Zindaggi Rocks (2006) as Kriya's mother and Mausi (double role)
The Japanese Wife (2010) as Maashi
Goynar Baksho (2013) as Pishi (Elder Rashmoni devi)
Piku (2015)
Sotti Aai To Jibon

Television

References

External links

Living people
Indian film actresses
Filmfare Lifetime Achievement Award winners
Actresses in Bengali cinema
Actresses in Hindi cinema
Filmfare Awards winners
Year of birth missing (living people)